Elsie Addo Awadzi is a Ghanaian international economic and financial lawyer. She was appointed 2nd deputy governor of the Bank of Ghana in February 2018, the second female to hold that position. She was elected as Chairperson of the Alliance for Financial Inclusion's Gender Inclusive Finance Committee in 2020.

Education 
Addo graduated from the University of Ghana with a law degree and an M.B.A. in finance. She then furthered at the Georgetown University Law Center, where she acquired a master of law degree in international business and economic law.

Career 
Addo worked as a commissioner of Ghana's Securities and Exchange Commission for six years and then as a Senior Counsel of the IMF's Legal Department (Financial and Fiscal Law Unit), where she advised on financial sector reforms in the context of the IMF's surveillance, lending and technical assistance activities. She had over 20 years experience working in various capacities in Ghana, Japan, South Africa, and the United Kingdom when she was the second female to be 2nd Deputy Governor of the Bank of Ghana. She was appointed in February 2018 by Nana Addo Dankwa Akufo-Addo

Works 
She is the author of the following works:
 Designing Legal Frameworks for Public Debt Management
 Resolution Frameworks for Islamic Banks
 Private law underpinnings of public

References

Living people
21st-century Ghanaian businesswomen
21st-century Ghanaian businesspeople
Ghanaian women lawyers
Georgetown University Law Center alumni
University of Ghana alumni
Ghana School of Law alumni
Year of birth missing (living people)
21st-century Ghanaian lawyers